Sexy Darling is a women's fragrance from Coty, Inc., and the Third perfume to be endorsed by Kylie Minogue. Sexy Darling was created by Sophie Labbe.

Scent 
The scent contains the base of Darling with elements of blood orange, pear, pink pepper, red rose, belle de nuit, jasmine, sandalwood, and musk.

Design 
The Elegant, Gracefully rounded Bottle will be a stylish must have addition to any dressing table. The packaging echos the bottle with its deep red box, Kylie's trademark 'K' in a black lace pattern that evokes her seductive glamour.

Kylie Minogue perfumes
Products introduced in 2008